In financial mathematics, acceptance set is a set of acceptable future net worth which is acceptable to the regulator. It is related to risk measures.

Mathematical Definition

Scalar Case
An acceptance set is a set  satisfying:
 
  such that 
 
 Additionally if  is convex then it is a convex acceptance set
 And if  is a positively homogeneous cone then it is a coherent acceptance set

Set-valued Case
An acceptance set (in a space with  assets) is a set  satisfying:
  with  denoting the random variable that is constantly 1 -a.s.
 
 
Additionally, if  is convex (a convex cone) then it is called a convex (coherent) acceptance set. 

Relation to Risk Measures
An acceptance set is convex (coherent) if and only if the corresponding risk measure is convex (coherent).

Risk Measure to Acceptance Set
 If  is a (scalar) risk measure then  is an acceptance set.
 If  is a set-valued risk measure then  is an acceptance set.

Acceptance Set to Risk Measure
 If  is an acceptance set (in 1-d) then  defines a (scalar) risk measure.
 If  is an acceptance set then  is a set-valued risk measure.

Examples

Superhedging price

The acceptance set associated with the superhedging price is the negative of the set of values of a self-financing portfolio at the terminal time.  That is
 .

Entropic risk measure

The acceptance set associated with the entropic risk measure is the set of payoffs with positive expected utility.  That is
 
where  is the exponential utility function.

References

Financial risk modeling